WebsterX is a Milwaukee-based alt-rap singer and songwriter, blending indie-rock and hip-hop. Motifs within his work contrast darkness and depression with hopeful upbeat and psychedelic instrumentation. The Fader speaks to his work as a "personal dive into the rapper's psyche", as he wrestles with his "doubts and fears but ultimately provides glimmers of hope throughout." WebsterX writes all his own lyrics and works with a number of producers to create the beats. In 2016, WebsterX was awarded 'Solo Artist of the Year' by the Radio Milwaukee Music Awards, sponsored by Koss. Among his affiliates include Chance the Rapper, Bon Iver, SaveMoney crew and Mick Jenkins. Also in 2016, WebsterX signed to Chicago-based label Closed Sessions, whose alumni include Vic Mensa, Kweku Collins and Thelonious Martin. His song "Intuition" was featured in a Super Bowl ad for the Microsoft Surface, starring Arizona Cardinals wide receiver Larry Fitzgerald. WebsterX was set to perform alongside Bon Iver for his Wisconsin Get Out the Vote tour in October 2020 but has since been postponed due to COVID-19. His music has been featured in The Fader, NPR, Complex, PBS, Paper Magazine, Vice, Bonafide Magazine, Hypebeast, Koss, TimeOut, and Pitchfork.

Career 
Inspired by a family legacy in music, Sam Ahmed was born to Ethiopian immigrant parents – his father was the notable Hari musician, Abdi Guitar of known African group, Roha Band. in 2015, Ahmed dropped out of the University of Wisconsin-Milwaukee and deciding to pursue music and art full-time.

He released his debut mixtape Desperate Youth in 2013, his 2015 single “Doomsday” and its subsequent video earning national press. In late 2015, he released a collaborative EP with NAN producer Q the Sun, called KidX. The same year he performed with Riff Raff, and Chanel West Coast at historic Milwaukee music venue, The Rave.  In March 2017 he released his 15-track debut album Daymares, produced by Simen Sez, which was awarded No. 1 on the Journal Sentinel's Best Milwaukee Albums of 2017 List. WebsterX performed at SXSW in both 2016 and 2018. Notable 2019 performances include opening for Lil Yachty at Freakfest. In fall of 2019 WebsterX was selected by director Enrique "Mag" Rodriguez, for an offer to join the Backline Music generator, a 12-week grant accelerator program developed by venture capital firm Gener8tor, which provides coaching, mentoring, industry networking, and grants to cohorts of up to three musicians annually.

Aside from music, WebsterX supports youth-oriented community engagement and is a co-founder of organization FreeSpace, founded in 2015 as a free, monthly, all-ages music showcase that invites Milwaukee's young creatives to come together and collaborate. Hosts bring together guest youth artists mainly from Milwaukee's North and West sides and build skills as experienced headliners perform alongside emerging artists. Interviews are also conducted with the artist in front of an audience. Freespace evolved into The New State, an upcoming permanent all-ages music venue, engineering studio, consignment store and performance space in the heart of Milwaukee. WebsterX was additionally part of the Milwaukee music collective, New Age Narcissism. The group – whose members include Lex Allen, Siren, Lorde Fred33, Bo Triplex, Jay Anderson, and Christopher Gilbert – each having their own solo careers, sporadically performed and created together. The group "toured" and collaborated with Milwaukee Public Schools, performing at elementary and middle schools while educating students on music entrepreneurship.

In 2020, WebsterX hosted the 3,000 rider strong Black Is Beautiful benefit bike ride in honor of POC Mental health, proceeds going to local charities ConnectMilwaukee & Wisconsin Bike Fed.

Discography 
 1 Of 1 (2021)
 Everfeel (2018)
 Ain't My Fault (2018)
 No End (2018)
 Feels (2018)
 Intuition (2018)
 Daymares (2017)
 Lost Ones Freestyle (2016)
 Blue Streak (2016)
 Everything (2016)
 Kinfolk (2015)
 Lately (2015)
 Doomsday (2015)
 KidX (2015)
 Desperate Youth (2013)

References 

Alternative hip hop musicians
1993 births
Living people
Musicians from Milwaukee